Music, Poetry and Madness (Spanish title:Músico, poeta y loco) is a 1948 Mexican comedy film directed by Humberto Gómez Landero and starring Germán Valdés, Marcelo Chávez and Meche Barba.

Cast
 Germán Valdés as Tin Tan
 Marcelo Chávez as Marcelo  
 Meche Barba as Mercedes Miraflores  
 Beatriz Ramos as Consuelo Fernández  
 Conchita Gentil Arcos as Doña Altagracia  
 Maruja Grifell as Señorita directora  
 Natalia Gentil Arcos as Secretaria  
 Ernesto Finance as Don Maximiliano  
 Rafael Icardo as Don Esteban  
 Jesús Graña as Doctor Arsenio Mata Lozano  
 Humberto Rodríguez as Jefe de policía  
 Hernán Vera as Don Apolonio 
 Luis Arcaraz 
 Gloria Lozano as Chica baila con Tin Tan 
 Félix Medel 
 María Luisa Smith as Espectadora de vendedores  
 Manuel 'Loco' Valdés as Transeunte

References

Bibliography 
Joanne Hershfield & David R. Maciel. Mexico's Cinema: A Century of Film and Filmmakers. Rowman & Littlefield, 1999.

External links 
 

1948 films
1948 comedy films
Mexican comedy films
1940s Spanish-language films
Films directed by Humberto Gómez Landero
Mexican black-and-white films
1940s Mexican films